Atlantis Armenian Airlines LLC, commonly known as Atlantis European Airways, was an airline operator registered in Armenia. The airline ceased operations on 20 February 2021.

Operations
As of 2014, the airline only offered codeshare flights in cooperation with Austrian Airlines and Czech Airlines without operating any own aircraft. However they started to build up their own fleet with a sole pre-owned Airbus A320-200 with the aim to serve leisure destinations.

According to the company's then business plan, the airline would operate flights from Yerevan to Tbilisi and Kutaisi airports in Georgia, as well as services to other destinations within the region. In 2020 summer season, Atlantis Armenian Airlines planned to operate flights from Yerevan to Vienna, Prague, and Athens, as well as to Kyiv and Moscow using Airbus A320 aircraft. The airline also intended to operate charter flights to various Greek Islands.

In August 2020, the Armenian authorities suspended the airlines licenses, it subsequently ceased all operations for good on 20 February 2021.

Fleet

The Atlantis European Airways fleet consisted of the following aircraft:

See also
 Armenia Aircompany
 Transport in Armenia
 List of airports in Armenia
 List of the busiest airports in Armenia

References

External links

 

Defunct airlines of Armenia
Airlines established in 2004
Airlines disestablished in 2021
Armenian companies established in 2004